"I'd Like to Teach the World to Sing (In Perfect Harmony)" is a pop song that originated as the jingle "True Love and Apple Pie", by British hit songwriters Roger Cook and Roger Greenaway, and sung by Susan Shirley.

The lyrics were rewritten by the songwriters, together with US advertising executive Bill Backer and US songwriter Billy Davis, for The Coca-Cola Company's then-advertising agency, McCann Erickson, to become "Buy the World a Coke" in the 1971 "Hilltop" television commercial for Coca-Cola and sung by the Hillside Singers. "Buy the World a Coke" was produced by Billy Davis and portrayed a positive message of hope and love, featuring a multicultural collection of teenagers on top of a hill appearing to sing the song.

The popularity of the jingle led to it being re-recorded in two versions: one by the New Seekers and another by the Hillside Singers, as a full-length song, dropping references to Coca-Cola. The song became a hit record in the US and the UK.

Origins
The idea originally came to Bill Backer, an advertising executive working for McCann Erickson, the agency responsible for Coca-Cola. Backer, Roger Cook and Billy Davis were delayed at Shannon Airport in Ireland. After a forced layover with many hot tempers, they noticed their fellow travelers the next morning were talking and joking while drinking Coca-Cola. Backer wrote the line "I'd like to buy the world a Coke" on a napkin and shared it with British hit songwriters Cook and Roger Greenaway.

The melody was derived from a previous jingle by Cook and Greenaway, originally called "True Love and Apple Pie" that was recorded in 1971 by Susan Shirley. Cook, Greenaway, Backer, and Billy Davis reworked the song into a Coca-Cola radio jingle, which was performed by British pop group The New Seekers and recorded at Trident Studios in London. The radio jingle made its debut in February 1971 before being adapted for the Coca-Cola "Hilltop" television commercial later that year.

The commercial ended with the statement:

The song became so popular that its creators revised it, adding three verses and removing product references to create a full-length song appropriate for commercial release. The full-length song was re-recorded by both The Hillside Singers and The New Seekers and both versions became huge hits.

TV commercial

Lyrics
"Buy the World a Coke" contains the line "I'd like to buy the world a Coke" and repeats "It's the real thing", which was Coca-Cola's marketing slogan at the time. The Coca-Cola Company introduced that slogan in October 1969.

Versions as an ad
Several versions of the ad have been made.
 The song first aired on American radio on February 12, 1971, but not all of the Coca-Cola bottlers were impressed. However, DJs reported that they were receiving requests to hear the commercial. Backer persuaded McCann-Erickson to film a commercial using the song. The TV commercial, titled "Hilltop", was directed by Roberto Malenotti. The ad cost $250,000 ($ million today), the most expensive commercial in history at that time.
The first attempt at shooting was ruined by rain and other location problems. The finished product, first aired in July 1971, featured a multicultural group of young people lip synching the song on a hill in Manziana, outside Rome, Italy. The global unity of the singers is emphasized by showing that the bottles of Coke they are holding are labelled in a variety of languages. The South African government asked for a version of the commercial without the black actors. Coca-Cola refused its request. The company later reduced its investment in that country, the then CEO saying "We have been reducing our investment in South Africa since 1976, and we have now decided to sell our remaining holdings in that country".
 In 1990, a follow-up to this commercial, called "Hilltop Reunion" and directed by Jeff Lovinger, aired during coverage of Super Bowl XXIV. It featured the original singers (now adults) and their children, and culminated in a medley of this song and the then-current "Can't Beat the Real Thing" jingle.
 G. Love remade the song for the Coca-Cola Zero commercial "Everybody Chill", which aired in 2005.
 In 2006, the song was used again in a Coca-Cola commercial in the Netherlands, performed by Dutch singer Berget Lewis.
 In 2010, Coca-Cola once again used the song in a television commercial featuring the entire line of its sponsored NASCAR Sprint Cup drivers. The commercial included the drivers singing the song while driving in a race.
 In 2011, information on how many dollars it would take "to buy the world a Coke" was given in a commercial featuring the red silhouette of a Coke bottle and the melody of the song.
 In 2012, As part of the Google Project Rebrief campaign, the Hilltop ad was reimagined for the digital age. Via the web, people were able to "send" a Coke to special vending machines located around the globe. Recipients of the Coke could then record a thank-you message to send back to the sender. Machines were located in Buenos Aires; Cape Town; Mountain View, California; and New York City.
 In 2015, a public service announcement was made by Center for Science in the Public Interest about the consequences of excessive soda consumption, and contained an altered version of I'd Like To Teach The World To Sing. The advert featured hospital doctors and dentists, and patients struggling with obesity-induced diseases (type 2 diabetes, hypertension and tooth decay). Near the end it showed Pepsi, Coca-Cola and Mountain Dew in beverage cups named "Obesity", "Diabetes Type Two" and "Tooth Decay" in the respective typefaces being poured away. The campaign was named "Change the Tune".

Significance and reception
In 2007, Campaign magazine called it "one of the best-loved and most influential ads in TV history". It served as a milestone—the first instance of the recording industry's involvement with advertising.

Marketing analysts have noted Coca-Cola's strategy of marrying the idea of happiness and universal love of the product illustrated by the song.

The commercial has continued receiving accolades in more recent times. In 2000, Channel 4 and The Sunday Times ranked the song 16th in the 100 Greatest TV Ads, while in 2005, ITV ranked the advertisement 10th in its list of the greatest advertisements of all time.

Singles

The Hillside Singers
After the TV commercial aired, radio stations began to get calls from people who liked it. Billy Davis' friends in radio suggested he record the song, but not as an advertising jingle. It became so popular that the song was rewritten without brand name references and expanded to three verses. Davis recruited a group of studio singers to take it on because The New Seekers did not have time to record it. The studio group named themselves The Hillside Singers to identify with the ad, and within two weeks the song was on the national charts. The Hillside Singers' version reached #13 on the Billboard Hot 100 and #5 on Billboard's Easy Listening chart.  Billboard ranked this version as the No. 97 song for 1972.

The New Seekers
The New Seekers later recorded the song and sold 96,000 copies of their record in one day, eventually selling 12 million total. "I'd Like to Teach the World to Sing (In Perfect Harmony)" climbed to UK #1 and US #7 in 1971 and 1972. The song became a gold record in the U.S., and has also sold over a million copies in the UK. The Coca-Cola Company waived royalties to the song, and instead donated $80,000 in payments to UNICEF. Billboard ranked this version as the No. 93 song for 1972.

Chart performance

Weekly charts

Year-end charts

New Seekers version

Hillside Singers version

Covers and inspiration for other music
 A Japanese version was recorded in 1972, 3 people would later become members of The Candies the following year.
 The British rock band Oasis was sued after their recording "Shakermaker" borrowed its melody and some lyrics directly; they were forced to change their composition.
 Oasis tribute band No Way Sis released a cover of "I'd Like to Teach the World to Sing", entering the British charts at number 27 in 1996.
 In 1997, the rock band Smash Mouth put a reference of the song in early lines of their first major single "Walkin' on the Sun".
 A version of the song was included in a Kidsongs video.
 The VeggieTales covered the song on their album Bob and Larry Sing the 70's.
 Gordon Webster recorded a live cover of the song on his 2013 album Live at Boston Swing Central.
 In 2015, US health advocates Center for Science in the Public Interest (CSPI) created a parody in an effort to spread awareness of the dangers of drinking too much soda.
 In 2016, Lucy Layton (daughter of New Seekers singer and bassist Paul Layton) released a cover.  Her official video, posted to YouTube on September 23, depicted the extreme violence faced by Syrian refugees, with the visuals of war being in stark contrast to the song's message of peace and harmony.
 In 2017, The Canadian vocal group The Tenors used parts of 'Teach the World' in the song "Santa's Wish (Teach the World)" on their album Christmas Together.
 In 2018, the People's Republic of China promoted its Belt and Road initiative with a video of a song called "I'd Like to Build the World a Road" based on the lyrics, melody, and imagery of Coke's Hilltop ad and song.
 In 2020, the Icelandic band amiina released a version of the song.

In popular culture
The commercial was used as the final scene (minus the It's the Real Thing statement at the end) in the Mad Men series finale, "Person to Person" (airdate May 17, 2015), which was set in November 1970, at an oceanside spiritual retreat in California. It is implied that the show's fictional protagonist, Don Draper, was behind the commercial's creation.

The song was featured briefly in the 2001 movie Freddy Got Fingered and was also used in Jeremy Paxman's final edition of Newsnight in 2014.

A version of the song was used in the trailer for Resident Evil.

See also
 Advertising management
 Brand management
 "First Time" (Robin Beck song), which also came to prominence via a Coca-Cola TV commercial
 Share a Coke – Coca-Cola Campaign running from 2010 – 2017

References

External links
 Coca-Cola Company, The Making of 'I'd Like to Buy the World a Coke' 
 

Peace songs
1971 songs
1971 singles
1972 singles
Advertising campaigns
Irish Singles Chart number-one singles
Number-one singles in New Zealand
Oricon International Singles Chart number-one singles
Oricon Weekly number-one singles
Promotional campaigns by Coca-Cola
Songs about music
Songs against racism and xenophobia
Songs based on jingles
Songs written by Roger Cook (songwriter)
Songs written by Roger Greenaway
Super Bowl commercials
UK Singles Chart number-one singles
1971 neologisms
Quotations from music
1970s television commercials
Philips Records singles
Polydor Records singles
Elektra Records singles